The 2020–21 Louisiana Ragin' Cajuns men's basketball team represented the University of Louisiana at Lafayette during the 2020–21 NCAA Division I men's basketball season. The Ragin' Cajuns, led by eleventh-year head coach Bob Marlin, played their home games at the Cajundome as members of the Sun Belt Conference. With the creation of divisions to cut down on travel due to the COVID-19 pandemic, they played in the West Division.

Previous season
The Ragin' Cajuns finished the 2019–20 season 14–19, 8–12 in Sun Belt play to finish eighth in the conference. The Cajuns proceeded to the Sun Belt Conference Men's Basketball Tournament. They ultimately lost to the Georgia Southern Eagles in heartbreaking fashion by the score of 81–82 in the second round. Shortly after their elimination, all sporting events as well as the finale of the tournament was cancelled due to the COVID-19 pandemic.

Offseason

Departures

Transfers

Recruiting

Roster

Schedule and results

|-
!colspan=9 style=| Non-conference Regular season

|-
!colspan=9 style=| Conference Regular season

|-
!colspan=9 style=| Sun Belt tournament

See also
 2020–21 Louisiana Ragin' Cajuns women's basketball team

References 

Louisiana Ragin' Cajuns men's basketball seasons
Louisiana-Lafayette
Louisiana
Louisiana